The Battle of Antrodoco (Rieti) was fought on 7 March 1821 between Austria and Neapolitan rebels. The Austrians were victorious. The rebel Neapolitan general Guglielmo Pepe commanded a force numbering 10,000 soldiers, whilst the Austrian general Johann Frimont commanded an army of around 14,500 soldiers.

Aftermath
On 24 March the victorious Austrian army entered Naples and restored Ferdinand I to the throne. Johann Frimont reward from King Ferdinand of Naples was the title of the Prince of Antrodoco and a handsome sum of money, and from his own King promotion to the rank of General of the Cavalry. After this he commanded Austrian forces in North Italy, and was called upon to deal with many outbreaks of rebellion from Italian patriots. He became president of the Aulic council in 1831, but would die only a few months later in Vienna.

References

Rieti
Rieti
1821 in the Austrian Empire
1821 in Italy
March 1821 events